Football coach may refer to:

Manager (association football)
Coach (American football)
Head coach
Offensive coordinator
Defensive coordinator
Special teams coordinator
College Coach, a 1933 American film

See also
Coach (sport)
Strength and conditioning coach